Alex Salmond's term as first minister of Scotland began on 17 May 2007 when he was formally sworn into office at the Court of Session. It followed his Scottish National Party's win at the 2007 Scottish Parliament election, where his party defeated the incumbent Labour Party by just one seat. Salmond's term ended on 18 November 2014, following his resignation in the aftermath of the Yes campaign's defeat in the 2014 Scottish independence referendum.

Salmond led the Scottish National Party (SNP) through the 2007 Scottish Parliament election, where his party won 47 seats, one more than the incumbent Scottish Labour. Initially approaching the Scottish Liberal Democrats for a coalition, they declined, and instead, Salmond formed a minority government with the confidence and supply deal of the Scottish Greens. Entering office, the Salmond administration conducted a series of reforms of the Scottish Executive, including rebranding the Executive to the Scottish Government. A month into his term, he was faced with the 2007 Glasgow Airport attack, Scotland's worst terrorist attack since the Lockerbie bombing in 1988. The first nationalist First Minister, Salmond's government made attempts to push legislation for a referendum on Independence, however, the SNP failed to obtain support from other parties and withdrew the draft bill. His government passed legislation on free prescription charges and free university tuition fees. Salmond was committed to tackling the climate crisis through the Partnership Agreement with the Maldives, one of the most exposed countries to the consequences of rising sea levels.

The 2011 Scottish Parliament election resulted in Salmond winning an unprecedented landslide victory. The SNP won the first ever single-party majority, with 69 out of the 129 seats in the Scottish Parliament. Salmond used his majority to push for a referendum on the second-half of the parliament term. As constitutional matters remain reserved to the British Government, Prime Minister David Cameron agreed to grant the powers to hold a referendum known as the Edinburgh Agreement. The Scottish independence referendum was held on 18 September 2014, with a majority of the Scottish people voting against independence. As a result, Salmond resigned as First Minister of Scotland and leader of the SNP.

Transition to first minister 

Salmond led the Scottish National Party through the 2007 Scottish election to the 3rd Scottish Parliament. His party came out as the largest party with 47 seats, one seat ahead of the incumbent Scottish Labour. The SNP initially approached the Scottish Liberal Democrats to form a coalition, but they declined to take part in negotiations. This left the SNP without any possibility to form a coalition with an overall majority. Ultimately, the Scottish Greens agreed to vote in an SNP minority government in return for concessions on climate policy and naming a Green to chair a committee.

With the support of the Greens, Salmond was elected by the Scottish Parliament as First Minister on 16 

May 2007, and was sworn in the following day after receiving the Royal Warrant from the Queen and taking the official oath of allegiance before judges at the Court of Session. Salmond became the first nationalist politician to hold the office of First Minister and it was the first time an incumbent First Minister was defeated from office.

Under section 45(7) of the Scotland Act 1998 he became Keeper of the Great Seal of Scotland at the same time.  He was appointed to the Privy Council four weeks later, giving him the title of 'The Right Honourable'.

First term

Cabinet appointments and changes 

On the same day of Salmond's appointment, he began making appointments to the Scottish Cabinet. He reduced the size of the Cabinet from nine members to six and restyled the title of cabinet members from 'Minister' to 'Cabinet Secretary'. He sought govern on a "policy by policy" basis and removed the Lord Advocate from cabinet, in order for the position to be non-partisan.

Salmond appointed SNP Depute Leader Nicola Sturgeon as Deputy First Minister of Scotland, as well as, the role of Cabinet Secretary for Health and Wellbeing. John Swinney was appointed Cabinet Secretary for Finance and Sustainable Growth, Fiona Hyslop Cabinet Secretary for Education and Lifelong Learning, Kenny MacAskill Cabinet Secretary for Justice, and Richard Lochhead Cabinet Secretary for Rural Affairs and the Environment.

On 2 September 2007, the Scottish Executive rebranded to the Scottish Government. Salmond said the change was made so that the executive acted like a government. However, it received major criticism by other parties over the cost, which was estimated to have been around £100,000 for the rebrand.

Scottish independence proposal 
A white paper for an independence referendum, setting out four possible options ranging from no change to full independence, was published by the Scottish Government on 30 November 2009. A draft bill for public consultation was published on 25 February 2010, setting out a two-question yes/no referendum, proposing further devolution or full independence. The SNP failed to obtain support from other parties and withdrew the draft bill.

2007 Glasgow Airport attacks 

Salmond had been First Minister of Scotland for just over a month when the first terrorism attack in Scotland since the bombing of Pan Am Flight 103 over the town of Lockerbie in December 1988, when a vehicle rammed the front entrance of the main terminal building at Glasgow Airport on 30 June 2007. In a statement addressing the attacks in Glasgow, Salmond stated "terrorist acts are the work of individuals not communities and the arrival of terror on our soil must not result in racist attacks on ethnic minorities whose only crime is to share the same religion and colour as the bombers. It is to be hoped that yesterday's attack is an isolated incident, but the reality is that we will have to deal with more in the future. We must not allow terrorists to stop us from going about our lives as we always have – to do so would be to hand a victory to the men of terror."

Salmond issued a statement regarding the attacks in Edinburgh, calling for "the need for vigilance and unity against the forces of terror and rightly praised the work of the emergency services". Salmond called a meeting of the Scottish Government security advisers in St Andrew's House in Edinburgh, followed by a request from the Prime Minister Gordon Brown for Salmond, the Cabinet Secretary for Justice Kenny MacAskill and the Lord Advocate Elish Angiolini to attend an emergency COBRA meeting. By the evening of 30 June, Salmond had attended an online conference discussion with the Prime Minister of the United Kingdom Gordon Brown and his governmental cabinet.

Renewable energy 

Salmond in his 2010 New Year message highlighted the importance of sustainable development and renewable energy in Scotland and the required increase in powers of the Scottish Parliament needed to help harness Scotland's green energy potential and therefore take full advantage of the "renewable revolution". Earlier, in December 2009, he campaigned for climate change legislation at the UN Climate Change Conference in Copenhagen to promote Scotland's role in tackling and mitigating climate change. This included signing a Partnership Agreement with the Maldives, one of the most exposed countries to the consequences of rising sea levels.

Although energy is mostly a matter reserved to Westminster, administrative devolution of Sections 36 & 37 of the Electricity Act 1989 coupled with fully devolved planning powers enabled the Scottish Government to establish Scotland as a leader in renewable energy developments.

2010 UK general election 

Salmond said it would be "unacceptable" for the SNP to be excluded from the 2010 UK election televised debate and sought "guarantees of inclusion from the broadcasters, given their inescapable duty to ensure fairness and impartiality in election-related coverage in Scotland" in the buildup to the 2010 UK general election. The party used the Freedom of Information Act to see whether the BBC could have broken its own rules. Salmond said it was unacceptable to Scotland as well as to the SNP for the broadcasters to exclude the party that formed the Scottish Government and was leading in Westminster election polls. He emphasised that he was not trying to stop any debates from being broadcast. After having failed to change the BBC's decision to not include the SNP in the final British debate, in line with the decision by ITV and Sky News, the SNP mounted a legal challenge to the BBC at the Court of Session in Edinburgh. Despite earlier reassurances by the SNP that it was not trying to stop the broadcast, it sought an 'interim interdict' to prevent the debate being broadcast without the participation of the SNP. The Court of Session dismissed the SNP's complaint, and refused to ban the BBC from broadcasting the third debate in Scotland, on the grounds that the SNP had left the bringing of the case "far too late", had not contested the broadcasting of the first two debates by ITV and Sky Television, and that the third debate would in any case be broadcast by Sky on satellite across Britain, which a Scottish court had no power to block. The judge ordered the SNP to pay the BBC's legal expenses. The SNP's political opponents described the SNP's contesting of the case as a "stunt".

There were Scottish debates dealing with specifically devolved issues which Salmond had accepted the invitation to attend along the other parties within the Scottish Parliament on Sky TV. Salmond declined to attend those held on the BBC and ITV, and Angus Robertson agreed to take his place in the other debates.

2011 SNP landslide victory 

Before the 2011 Scottish election, the SNP again pledged to hold an independence referendum if it won another term.  The Westminster Labour government had initially designed the additional member system to make it impossible for one party to win an outright majority, but the SNP won enough seats from the other parties to take 69 seats, a majority of four. At this election, Salmond was reelected for Aberdeenshire East, essentially a reconfigured version of Gordon. The SNP's overall majority assured Salmond of another term as First Minister, and he was reelected unopposed on 18 May. It also gave Salmond the ability to call a referendum on Scottish independence.

Second Cabinet 

Salmond secured a second term as First Minister and formed his second administration. Nicola Sturgeon remained as Deputy First Minister and Health Secretary, until 2012, when she was reshuffled to Cabinet Secretary for Infrastructure, Capital Investment and Cities. Sturgeon's reshuffle was made for her to have overall responsibility over the Scottish independence referendum. Salmond increased his cabinet size from six to eight. John Swinney, Michael Russell, Kenny MacAskill and Richard Lochhead all remained. Fiona Hyslop, Alex Neil and Bruce Crawford were all promoted to cabinet.

2014 Scottish Independence Referendum 

Following Salmond's election victory in the 2011, which produced an SNP majority, he pushed for a referendum on Scottish independence. While constitutional matters are reserved to the UK Government, Prime Minister David Cameron said he wouldn't stop a referendum from happening. The following year the Scottish Government announced that they intended to hold the referendum in late 2014. On 15 October 2012, an agreement, known as the Edinburgh Agreement, was signed by Salmond and Cameron which provided a legal framework for the referendum to be held.

The SNP government announced that the referendum would be held on 18 September 2014. Scotland's Future, a white paper setting out the Scottish Government's vision for an independent Scotland, was published on 26 November 2013.

Aftermath of the referendum

Resignation 

On 19 September 2014, following the results of the independence referendum which confirmed a majority of the Scottish people had voted against independence, Salmond announced that he would be resigning as First Minister. He intended not to seek re-election as leader of the SNP at the party's conference and rather someone new led Scotland forward. 

On 15 October, Deputy First Minister Nicola Sturgeon was the only candidate to stand for the leadership, and formally succeeded Salmond as SNP leader following the party's national conference in Perth on 14 November. Salmond submitted his resignation as First Minister to the Scottish Parliament and to the Queen on 18 November, and the formal selection of Sturgeon as his successor by the Scottish Parliament took place the following day.

See also 
 Alex Salmond
Politics of Scotland
Alex Salmond scandal

References 

Alex Salmond
Scottish governments
Ministries of Elizabeth II
2007 establishments in Scotland
2014 disestablishments in Scotland
Scottish premierships